Wang Dun (266 – after 8 August 324), courtesy name Chuzhong (處仲), nickname Ahei (阿黑), was a Chinese military general and warlord during the Jin dynasty.

Having brought Emperor Yuan (Sima Rui) to submission with his military force, Wang Dun had paramount authorities.  However, although he later appeared to intend to seize the Jin throne by force, he grew ill in 324. He later died as his forces were being repelled by Emperor Ming.

Early career 
Wang Dun was the son of the Jin official Wang Ji (王基), and he married Emperor Wu of Jin's daughter Princess Xiangcheng.  He served as an assistant to Emperor Hui's crown prince Sima Yu, and when Sima Yu was falsely accused of crime by Empress Jia Nanfeng and deposed, he risked his life to attend the crown prince's farewell, and received renown from that.  He later served as the governor of Yang Province (揚州, modern Zhejiang and southern part of Jiangsu and Anhui).  After Sima Rui, then the Prince of Langye, became in charge of the military operations in the area in 307, both Wang Dun and his cousin Wang Dao became key assistants to him, and it was said at the time that the domain was ruled equally by the Simas and the Wangs.

Later, as Jiang (江州, modern Jiangxi and eastern Hubei) and Jing (荊州, modern Hubei and Hunan) Provinces became overrun by agrarian rebels, the strongest of whom was Du Tao (杜弢), the leader of Yi Province (modern Sichuan and Chongqing) refugees who had fled from Cheng Han, Sima Rui put Wang Dun in charge of the western province operations, and Wang's effective coordination allowed the rebels to be eventually suppressed.  After suppressing Du Tao, in particular, however, Wang Dun became arrogant and began to see the western provinces as his own domain.  After Sima Rui declared himself emperor in 318 (after Emperor Min's execution by Han Zhao), Wang Dun nominally submitted to him, but continued to strengthen his own domain.

First campaign against the Jin imperial government 
Seeing Wang Dun's ambition, Emperor Yuan began to fear him, and he began to group men around him who were against Wang Dun as well, such as Liu Huai (劉隗) and Diao Xie (刁協) -- men of mixed reputation who, in their efforts to suppress the Wangs' power offended many other people.  He also reduced the roles that Wang Dun's relatives, including Wang Dao, had in his government, which angered Wang Dun further.  Wang Dun was further encouraged by his assistants Qian Feng (錢鳳) and Shen Chong (沈充), both of whom persuaded him to plan a military confrontation with Emperor Yuan.  In 320, however, when Emperor Yuan, against Wang's request, made Sima Cheng (司馬承) the Prince of Qiao the governor of Xiang Province (湘州, modern Hunan) instead of Shen, Wang Dun was not yet ready to fully break with Emperor Yuan, and therefore allowed Sima Cheng to take his post.  In 321, Emperor Yuan further commissioned Dai Yuan (戴淵) and Liu with substantial forces, claiming that they were to defend against Later Zhao attacks, but instead was intending to have them defend against a potential Wang Dun attack.

In spring 322, Wang Dun started his campaign against Emperor Yuan, claiming that Emperor Yuan was being deluded by Liu and Diao, and that his only intent was to clean up the government.  He tried to persuade Gan Zhuo (甘卓), the governor of Liang Province (梁州, then consisting of modern northwestern Hubei and southeastern Shaanxi) and Sima Cheng (司馬承) the governor of Xiang Province to join him, and while both resisted, neither was effective in their campaigns against his rear guards. Wang quickly arrived in Jiankang, defeating Emperor Yuan's forces and entering and pillaging Jiankang easily.  Liu fled to Later Zhao, while Diao, Dai, and Zhou Yi (周顗) were killed. Emperor Yuan was forced to submit and grant Wang Dun additional powers in the west. Wang Dun, satisfied, allowed Emperor Yuan to remain on the throne (Although he toyed with the idea of removing Sima Shao the Crown Prince, fearful of Crown Prince Shao's decisiveness and diligence, Wang ended up not carrying out the idea), and personally withdrew back to his home base of Wuchang (武昌, in modern Ezhou, Hubei).  His forces then defeated and killed Sima Cheng, while a subordinate of Gan's, acting on Wang's orders, assassinated Gan.

Second campaign against the Jin imperial government 
After his defeat, Emperor Yuan grew despondent and ill.  Around the new year of 323, he died.  Crown Prince Shao succeeded to the throne as Emperor Ming.  Emperor Ming largely acted as if he were respectful of Wang Dun, yielding many military and governance decisions to him.  Wang Dun became even more arrogant than before, and his subordinates, headed by Qian and Shen, became exceeding corrupt and violent.  In 324, apprehensive of the powerful native Zhou clan (from which Zhou Yi came), Wang Dun had many of its members killed.

Later in 324, Wang Dun grew increasingly ill.  He commissioned his nephew Wang Ying (王應), whom he adopted as his own son because he was sonless, to be his deputy, and also commissioned Wen Jiao as the mayor of Jiankang, with intent to have Wen keep an eye on the emperor.  He intended that after he died, Wang Ying would lead his army to Jiankang and usurp the throne.  However, he did not know that Wen had actually been working with Emperor Ming's brother-in-law Yu Liang, and once Wen arrived in Jiankang, he revealed Wang Dun's illness and his plan, and Emperor Ming decided to take preemptive action, declaring Wang Dun a renegade and summoning the generals on the northern border to come to his aid.  Wang, upon hearing this, sent his brother (Wang Ying's biological father) Wang Han (王含) and Qian eastward to again attack Jiankang, but unlike what happened in his first campaign, Wang's forces ran into severe resistance from the imperial troops, greatly enhanced by the battle-tested northern defense troops, and suffered many losses.  Upon hearing the bad news, Wang Dun died.  Wang Ying did not declare that he had died and tried to carry on the campaign, but was eventually defeated.  Wang Ying and Wang Han were captured and killed, and Wang Dun's body was put into a kneeling position and then beheaded, but then returned to the Wang clan for burial.

References 

 Book of Jin, vol. 98.
 Zizhi Tongjian, vols. 83, 84, 87, 88, 89, 90, 91, 92, 93.

266 births
324 deaths
Chinese warlords
Jin dynasty (266–420) generals
Jin dynasty (266–420) rebels
Posthumous executions